Veronica, Veronika, etc., may refer to:

People
 Veronica (name)
 Saint Veronica
 Saint Veronica of Syria

Arts and media

Comics and literature
 Veronica, an 1870 novel by Frances Eleanor Trollope
 Veronica, a 2005 novel by Mary Gaitskill
 Veronica, an Archie Comics imprint

Film, radio, and television
 Veronica (1972 film), a Romanian musical film directed by Elisabeta Bostan
 Veronica (2017 Mexican film), a psychological thriller by Carlos Algara and Alejandro Martinez-Beltran
 Veronica (2017 Spanish film), a Spanish horror film
Veronica (media), a Dutch media brand
 Radio Veronica, a Dutch offshore radio station broadcasting from 1960–1974, the origin of the brand
Radio Veronica (Sky Radio), a Dutch radio station
 Veronica TV, a Dutch television station
 Veronica, now RTL 7, a former Dutch television station
 Veronica Superguide, a Dutch television Magazine

Music
 Veronica (singer) (born 1974), American dance-music singer
 "Veronica" (song), written by Elvis Costello and Paul McCartney, recorded by Costello
 The Veronicas, an Australian pop rock duo
 Veronika (Romanian singer) (born 1984)
 Veronika (Ukrainian singer) (21st century)

Botany
 Veronica (plant), a genus of flowering plant
 Shrubby veronicas, or Hebe, a genus of plants native to New Zealand

Other uses
 Verónica, Buenos Aires, town in Argentina
 Verónica (bullfighting), matador's move
 Veronica (mountain), also called Willka Wiqi, a mountain in Peru
 Veronica (search engine), search engine for the Gopher protocol

See also